Margaret Curran (born 1958) is a Labour politician.

Margaret or Peggy Curran may also refer to:

Margaret Curran (poet) 1887–1962), Australian poet 
Margaret E. Curran, United States Attorney for Rhode Island (from 1998 to 2003)
 Margaret Curran, Alaskan diphtheria patient, see 1925 serum run to Nome#Second relay
 Peggy Curran, former writer for Montreal Gazette
 Peggy Curran, Empress of Buxton and top class Nanny